Thein Myint born January 14, 1937 in Yangon) is a retired amateur boxer from Burma, who won the gold medal at the 1958 Asian Games in the men's bantamweight (– 54 kg) division. He represented his native country at three consecutive Summer Olympics, starting in 1956.

1960 Olympic results

Below is the record of Thein Myint, a Burmese bantamweight boxer who competed at the 1960 Rome Olympics:

 Round of 32: defeated Charles Reiff (Luxembourg) by decision, 5-0
 Round of 16: defeated Muhammad Nasir (Pakistan) by decision, 5-0
 Quarterfinal: lost to Oleg Grigoryev (Soviet Union) by walkover

1964 Olympic results

Below is the record of Thein Myint, a Burmese bantamweight boxer who competed at the 1964 Tokyo Olympics:

 Round of 32: lost to Isaac Aryee (Ghana) by knockout

References
 sports-reference

External links
 

1937 births
Living people
Burmese male boxers
Bantamweight boxers
Boxers at the 1956 Summer Olympics
Boxers at the 1960 Summer Olympics
Boxers at the 1964 Summer Olympics
Olympic boxers of Myanmar
Sportspeople from Yangon
Asian Games medalists in boxing
Boxers at the 1958 Asian Games
Asian Games gold medalists for Myanmar
Medalists at the 1958 Asian Games